Robert Leslie Rowse (8 September 1926 – 5 May 2016) was an Australian rules footballer who played with Melbourne in the Victorian Football League (VFL).

Family
He married Betty Mary McGill in 1950.

Cricket
He played in 40 first grade matches for the Prahran Cricket Club over six seasons (1945/6 to 1950/51), scoring a total of 798 runs (average 18.55; highest score 77).

In 1954, as the opening bat for a combined Mildura side, playing against a combined Ballarat side, he scored 108 in 141 minutes, with 15 4's — this was the top score for the 1954 Country Cricket Week competition.

Notes

References

External links 
 
 
 Bob Rowse, at Demonwiki.

1926 births
2016 deaths
Australian rules footballers from Victoria (Australia)
Ormond Amateur Football Club players
Melbourne Football Club players